The following is a list of notable male bullfighters which include includes bullfighters by country. The list of female bullfighters catalogues the spread of women in the sport.

Colombia

Luis Bolívar (born 1985).
Pepe Cáceres (1935–1987).
Edgar García, El Dandy (1959/1960–2020).
Henry Higgins (1944–1978).
Álvaro Múnera (born 1965).
César Rincón (born 1965).
Rodolfo Rincón Sosa (born 1954).

France
  (born 1983).
  (born 1989).
  Clemente (born 1995).
  Juan Bautista (born 1981).
  Juan Leal (born 1992). 
 Christian Montcouquiol, Nimeño II (1954–1991).
  (born 1997).

Mexico
Alejandro Amaya
Carlos Arruza El Ciclón
Inigo Arsuaga
Jaime Bravo
Guillermo Capetillo
Manuel Capetillo
Manuel Capetillo hijo
Eloy Cavazos
José Flores Pepillo
Rodolfo Gaona El Califa de León
Ricardo Moreno El Estudiante
Silverio Pérez El Faraón de Texcoco
Luis Procuna El Berrendito de San Juan 
Leandro Quiroga Machaquito
Carmelo Torres
José Torres El Pajarito
Bruno Vogt

Mozambique
Ricardo Chibanga

Perú

 (1920–2007).
 (born 1995). 
 (born 1996).
Rafael Santa Cruz (1928–1991).

Portugal
Mário Coelho
Manolo Dos Santos El Lobo
José Falcão
João Branco Núncio
Luis Rouxinol
José Júlio
Mário Coelho

Puerto Rico
Ernesto Pastor (1892–1921).

Spain

Julio Aparicio Díaz Julito Aparicio (born 1969)
José Miguel Arroyo Delgado, Joselito (born 1969)
Juan Belmonte, El Pasmo de Triana (1892–1962)
Manuel Benítez Pérez, El Cordobés (born 1936)
Alfonso Cela, Celita (1885–1932)
Javier Conde (born 1975)
Marcos de Celis (1932–2018)
Manuel Díaz González, El Cordobés (born 1968)
Luis Miguel González Lucas, Luis Miguel Dominguín (1926–1996)
David Fandila Marín, El Fandi (born 1981)
Iván Fandiño (1980–2017)
José Gallego Mateo, Pepete III (1883–1910)
Juan José García Corral (1952–2020)
José Gómez Ortega,  Joselito (1895–1920)
Rafael Gómez Ortega, El Gallo (1882–1960)
Dámaso González (1948–2017)
Rafael Guerra Bejarano, Guerrita (1862–1941)
Óscar Higares (born 1971)
Julián López Escobar, El Juli (born 1982)
Pablo Lozano, La Muleta de Castilla (1932–2020)
Jairo Miguel (born 1993)
Francisco Montes Reina, Paquiro (1804–1851)
Emilio Muñoz El pequeño Mozart del toreo (born 1962)
Manolo Navarro (1926–2020)
Antonio Ordóñez  (1932–1998)
Cayetano Ordóñez Niño de la Palma (1904–1961)
José Ortega Cano (born 1953)
Juan José Padilla Ciclón de Jerez (born 1973)
Ángel Peralta Pineda, El Centauro de las Marismas (1926–2018)
Enrique Ponce (born 1971)
Cayetano Rivera Ordóñez (born 1977)
Francisco Rivera Ordóñez (born 1974)
José Ruiz Baos Calatraveño (1946–2022)
Jaime Ostos (1931–2022)
Francisco Rivera Pérez, Paquirri (1948–1984)
José Rivera Pérez, Riverita (1947–2021)
Enrique Robles, Chicorrito
José Rodríguez Davié, Pepete II (1867–1899)
Manuel Laureano Rodríguez Sánchez, Manolete (1917–1947) 
José Dámaso Rodríguez y Rodríguez, Pepete (1824–1862) 
Curro Romero (born 1933)
Ignacio Sánchez Mejías (1891–1934)

United States
Sidney Franklin (1903–1976).
John Fulton (1932–1998).
David Renk El Texano (1963–2018).

United Kingdom
 Frank Evans
 Alexander Fiske-Harrison
 Henry Higgins

Fictional bullfighters
Escamillo, in Bizet's opera Carmen and the short story by Prosper Merimée on which it was based
Don Flamenco, Spanish boxer and bullfighter in the video game Punch-Out!!
Grampa Simpson, in The Simpsons episode "Million Dollar Abie"
Lydia González, in 2002 Spanish drama film Talk to her by Pedro Almodovar
Paco Pedro, regarded as the world's greatest matador and seducer, has appeared in three short films to date
Raul Bourneau, minor character in Hortensia Papadat-Bengescu's classic novel Fecioarele despletite (The Disheveled Maidens)
Vega, one of the bosses in the video game Street Fighter
El Primero, legendary but egotistical bullfighter who's the main antagonist in the movie Ferdinand (film)
Luis Montoya, retired, legendary Mexican bullfighter and antagonist in the television series Columbo, Season 5, Episode 4 "A Matter of Honor".

See also
 List of female bullfighters
 Bullfighting

References

Bullfighters